Bobby Browne (born 9 June 1962 in Dublin) is a former Irish footballer and manager.

He played in the League of Ireland in the 1980s and 1990s, mainly with Shelbourne.

He played for Shamrock Rovers making three total appearances (two in the league) in the 1984/85 season. Browne made one substitute appearance for The Hoops in the 1984-85 European Cup .

His longest spell was at Shelbourne where he was pivotal when the Reds won the 1991–92 League of Ireland Premier Division scoring 3 goals in 28 appearances.

This win guaranteed Shels entry into the 1992-93 UEFA Champions League where he made another substitute appearance against SC Tavriya Simferopol .

The following season, he won the FAI Cup which guaranteed entry into the 1993-94 European Cup Winners' Cup where
Browne appeared as a substitute 3 times at FC Karpaty Lviv , against Panathinaikos in the Olympic Stadium (Athens)
 and in the return leg .

He signed for Ards F.C. in January 1994 winning the County Antrim Shield but was back in the League of Ireland, this time in the League of Ireland First Division with Drogheda United in November. His good form helped the Boynesiders to promotion and he was named in the PFAI First Division XI for the 1994-95 League of Ireland First Division season. The following season Browne's form earned him the club player of the year award.

Browne signed for Dundalk for the 1996-97 League of Ireland Premier Division season and scored his only goal on his debut in a League of Ireland Cup game on 16 August.

After a season back at Hunky Dorys Park he moved to Monaghan United where he became player/manager in 1999.

Under Browne Monaghan regained promotion to the Premier Division in the 2000–2001 season. He resigned in September 2003 .

Browne was assistant manager of the Republic of Ireland under-23s in 2010.

In October 2010 Drogheda United appointed Browne as manager. Despite finishing bottom of the table in 2010 and being automatically relegated, Drogheda United were given a late reprieve just weeks before the new season when Sporting Fingal were wound up. Finding themselves back in the Premier Division, Bobby Browne was replaced by Monaghan United manager Mick Cooke on 27 February 2011, a week ahead of the first game of the 2011 season.

Honours

Club
Shelbourne
 League of Ireland Premier Division (1): 1991–92
 FAI Cup (1) 1993

Ards
 County Antrim Shield (1): 1993

Individual
 Drogheda United Player of the Year (1): 1995–96

1962 births
Living people
Republic of Ireland association footballers
Association football midfielders
St Patrick's Athletic F.C. players
Shamrock Rovers F.C. players
Athlone Town A.F.C. players
Shelbourne F.C. players
Ards F.C. players
Drogheda United F.C. players
Dundalk F.C. players
Monaghan United F.C. players
Association footballers from Dublin (city)
League of Ireland players
League of Ireland managers
Drogheda United F.C. managers
NIFL Premiership players
Republic of Ireland football managers
Monaghan United F.C. managers